Zhuangta Township is a rural township in Cili County, Zhangjiajie, Hunan Province, People's Republic of China.

Administrative division
The township is divided into 12 villages and 1 community, the following areas: Xizhuang Community, Xingdou Village, Zhuangta Village, Sanchaxi Village, Yueyan Village, Xinche Village, Shuitian Village, Xiaota Village, Fengping Village, Heicong Village, Maota Village, Longdeng Village, and Shuiku Village (西庄社区、星斗村、庄塔村、三岔溪村、月岩村、新车村、水田村、肖塔村、枫坪村、黑丛村、毛塔村、龙灯村、水库村).

References

Former towns and townships of Cili County